City Stadium Sileks is a multi-purpose stadium in Kratovo, North Macedonia.  It is currently used mostly for football matches and is the home stadium of FK Sileks.  The stadium holds 1,800 people.

References

External links
Fotos Sileks Stadion 

Football venues in North Macedonia
Multi-purpose stadiums in North Macedonia
Stadium
Kratovo, North Macedonia